Pheidole latinoda is a species of ant in the subfamily Myrmicinae.  It is found in India and Sri Lanka.

Subspecies
Pheidole latinoda angustior Forel, 1902 - India, Sri Lanka
Pheidole latinoda latinoda Roger, 1863 - Sri Lanka
Pheidole latinoda major Forel, 1885 - India
Pheidole latinoda peradeniyae Forel, 1911 - Sri Lanka

References

External links

 at antwiki.org
Animaldiversity.org
Itis.org

latinoda
Hymenoptera of Asia
Insects described in 1863